The arrondissement of Vouziers is an arrondissement of France in the Ardennes department in the Grand Est region. It has 118 communes.

Composition

The communes of the arrondissement of Vouziers, and their INSEE codes, are:
 
 Alland'Huy-et-Sausseuil (08006)
 Apremont (08017)
 Ardeuil-et-Montfauxelles (08018)
 Attigny (08025)
 Aure (08031)
 Authe (08033)
 Autruche (08035)
 Autry (08036)
 Bairon-et-ses-Environs (08116)
 Ballay (08045)
 Bar-lès-Buzancy (08049)
 Bayonville (08052)
 Beffu-et-le-Morthomme (08056)
 Belleville-et-Châtillon-sur-Bar (08057)
 Belval-Bois-des-Dames (08059)
 La Berlière (08061)
 Bouconville (08074)
 Boult-aux-Bois (08075)
 Bourcq (08077)
 Brécy-Brières (08082)
 Brieulles-sur-Bar (08085)
 Briquenay (08086)
 Buzancy (08089)
 Cauroy (08092)
 Challerange (08097)
 Champigneulle (08098)
 Charbogne (08103)
 Chardeny (08104)
 Chatel-Chéhéry (08109)
 Chevières (08120)
 Chuffilly-Roche (08123)
 Condé-lès-Autry (08128)
 Contreuve (08130)
 Cornay (08131)
 Coulommes-et-Marqueny (08134)
 La Croix-aux-Bois (08135)
 Dricourt (08147)
 Écordal (08151)
 Exermont (08161)
 Falaise (08164)
 Fléville (08171)
 Fossé (08176)
 Germont (08186)
 Givry (08193)
 Les Grandes-Armoises (08019)
 Grandham (08197)
 Grandpré (08198)
 Grivy-Loisy (08200)
 Guincourt (08204)
 Harricourt (08215)
 Hauviné (08220)
 Imécourt (08233)
 Jonval (08238)
 Lametz (08244)
 Lançon (08245)
 Landres-et-Saint-Georges (08246)
 Leffincourt (08250)
 Liry (08256)
 Longwé (08259)
 Machault (08264)
 Manre (08271)
 Marcq (08274)
 Marquigny (08278)
 Mars-sous-Bourcq (08279)
 Marvaux-Vieux (08280)
 Mont-Saint-Martin (08308)
 Mont-Saint-Remy (08309)
 Montcheutin (08296)
 Montgon (08301)
 Monthois (08303)
 Mouron (08310)
 Neuville-Day (08321)
 Noirval (08325)
 Nouart (08326)
 Oches (08332)
 Olizy-Primat (08333)
 Pauvres (08338)
 Les Petites-Armoises (08020)
 Quatre-Champs (08350)
 Quilly (08351)
 Rilly-sur-Aisne (08364)
 La Sabotterie (08374)
 Saint-Clément-à-Arnes (08378)
 Sainte-Marie (08390)
 Saint-Étienne-à-Arnes (08379)
 Saint-Juvin (08383)
 Saint-Lambert-et-Mont-de-Jeux (08384)
 Saint-Loup-Terrier (08387)
 Saint-Morel (08392)
 Saint-Pierre-à-Arnes (08393)
 Saint-Pierremont (08394)
 Sainte-Vaubourg (08398)
 Saulces-Champenoises (08401)
 Sauville (08405)
 Savigny-sur-Aisne (08406)
 Séchault (08407)
 Semide (08410)
 Semuy (08411)
 Senuc (08412)
 Sommauthe (08424)
 Sommerance (08425)
 Sugny (08431)
 Suzanne (08433)
 Sy (08434)
 Tailly (08437)
 Tannay (08439)
 Thénorgues (08446)
 Toges (08453)
 Tourcelles-Chaumont (08455)
 Tourteron (08458)
 Vandy (08461)
 Vaux-Champagne (08462)
 Vaux-en-Dieulet (08463)
 Vaux-lès-Mouron (08464)
 Verpel (08470)
 Verrières (08471)
 Voncq (08489)
 Vouziers (08490)

History

The arrondissement of Vouziers was created in 1800.

As a result of the reorganisation of the cantons of France which came into effect in 2015, the borders of the cantons are no longer related to the borders of the arrondissements. The cantons of the arrondissement of Vouziers were, as of January 2015:

 Attigny
 Buzancy
 Le Chesne
 Grandpré
 Machault
 Monthois
 Tourteron
 Vouziers

Sub-prefects 
 Louis Thibon : 21 October 1898

References

Vouziers